Fines Church is a parish church of the Church of Norway in Indre Fosen municipality in Trøndelag county, Norway. It is located in the village of Verrabotn. It is one of the churches for the Rissa parish which is part of the Fosen prosti (deanery) in the Diocese of Nidaros. The white, wooden church was built in a long church style in 1915 using plans drawn up by the architect Ole Havnæs. The church seats about 136 people. The church has a pink interior.

Prior to 1 January 2020, the church was part of the Verran parish in what is now Sør-Innherad prosti. On that date, the Verrabotn area became part of Indre Fosen municipality and therefore the church changed parishes and joined the Fosen prosti.

See also
List of churches in Nidaros

References

Indre Fosen
Churches in Trøndelag
Long churches in Norway
Wooden churches in Norway
20th-century Church of Norway church buildings
Churches completed in 1915
1915 establishments in Norway